Mark-Haydn Griffiths is a British bassist who toured with Neil Innes in his touring ensemble of the fictional Beatles parody the Rutles where he performs Rutles songs and other songs from his career such as his songs from the Bonzo Dog Doo-Dah Band. He also has played with Cliff Richard's backing band and with the Shadows.

References

External links

Living people
The Shadows members
British bass guitarists
Male bass guitarists
The Rutles members
Year of birth missing (living people)